Aschera (minor planet designation: 214 Aschera) is a Main belt asteroid. It was discovered by Austrian astronomer Johann Palisa on February 29, 1880, in Pola and was named after the Sidonian goddess Asherah.

It is classified as a rare E-type asteroid and is fairly faint for an object of its type. The overall diameter is estimated to be 23 km and it has a geometric albedo of 0.52. Using a tri-axial ellipsoidal model derived from light curve data, the overall shape of the asteroid is estimated to be a/b = 1.24 ± 0.12 and b/c = 1.83 ± 0.10, where a, b, c are the three axes of an ellipsoid.

References

External links 
 The Asteroid Orbital Elements Database
 Minor Planet Discovery Circumstances
 Asteroid Lightcurve Data File
 
 

Background asteroids
Aschera
Aschera
E-type asteroids (Tholen)
Xc-type asteroids (SMASS)
18800229
Asherah